Under-reporting usually refers to some issue, incident, statistic, etc., that individuals, responsible agencies, or news media have not reported, or have reported as less than the actual level or amount. Under-reporting of crimes, for example, makes it hard to figure the actual incidence of crimes.

Under-reporting is a failure in data reporting.

Crime

Various estimates have been provided in relation to under-reporting of crimes across the world. According to the American Medical Association (1995), sexual violence, and rape in particular, is considered the most under-reported violent crime. Common reasons for individuals not reporting crime include fear of not being believed, insecurity, and fear of getting into trouble. These reasons are most common for not reporting rape. It is commonly assumed that most of the rape cases go unreported; some estimates go up to or above 90%. (See also Rape reporting.) Non-recognition of domestic violence may lead to under-reporting.

Murders are sometimes not reported, due to the fear of the alleged murderer's connection with another murderer, or because of a settlement.

In 2012, the universities of Leicester and Westminster, while collaborating with Serious Organised Crime Agency, estimated that 200,000 people had been victims of online dating fraud. The report included instances of under-reported frauds.

The reported murder rates in China have been criticized for under-reporting unsolved murders due to police salaries being based on the rate of solved cases.

Disease

Under-reported dengue in India, polio in China and Pakistan, disability in Malaysia, and COVID-19 in many countries remain a problem. In the United States, it was estimated in 1989 that 40% of the AIDS cases in South Carolina went unreported. In 2008, out of 2,460 deaths from AIDS-related illnesses during a six-year period in Washington, DC, an estimated of 1,337 had not been reported. On the basis of national surveys and excess death statistics it was estimated that Covid-19 mortality through September 2021 has been under-reported in India by a factor of as much as 6 or 7.

Population

Under-reporting of population in countries such as China has been documented.

See also
Institute for Public Accuracy
Dark figure of crime

References

External links
‘Murders by Illegals go Unreported’
Under Reported Stories by Thomson Reuters Foundation
Under-Told Stories

Data collection in research